How to Tame Lions is the fourth extended play by Australian singer-songwriter, Washington. It was released in September 2009.

Following an appearance on Spicks & Specks, the EP debuted and peaked at number 73 on the ARIA Charts in October 2009.

Track listing

Charts

References 

2009 albums
2009 EPs
EPs by Australian artists
Megan Washington albums